The Massachusetts Bay Transportation Authority (MBTA) operates rapid transit (heavy rail), light rail, and bus rapid transit services in the Boston metropolitan area, collectively referred to as the rapid transit, subway, or the T system.

The color-branded lines consist of three heavy rail lines (Red, Orange, and Blue), one branched light rail system (Green), and a short light rail line (the Ashmont–Mattapan High-Speed Line, colored as part of the Red Line). All except the Ashmont–Mattapan line operate in tunnels in the downtown area, but no route operates entirely underground, and only 31 out of the system's 147 stations are located underground. The five branches of the Silver Line bus rapid transit network are also shown as part of the rapid transit system. Three branches operate underground and charge rapid transit fares; two branches operate entirely on the surface and charge lower bus fares.

The section of the Tremont Street subway between Park Street and Boylston Street stations, now on the Green Line, opened in 1897, making it the oldest transit subway in the United States still in use. (Only the short-lived Beach Pneumatic Transit demonstration line in New York City was built before.)

History 

Opened in September 1897, the four-track-wide segment of the Green Line tunnel between Park Street and Boylston stations was the first subway in the United States, and has been designated a National Historic Landmark. The downtown portions of what are now the Green, Orange, Blue, and Red line tunnels were all in service by 1912. Additions to the rapid transit network occurred in most decades of the 1900s, and continued in the 2000s with the addition of Silver Line bus rapid transit and Green Line Extension. (See MBTA History and MBTA Future plans sections.)

Streetcar congestion in downtown Boston led to the creation of underground subways and elevated rail, the former in 1897 and the latter in 1901. The Tremont Street subway was the first rapid transit tunnel in the United States. The grade-separated railways added transportation capacity while avoiding delays caused by intersections with cross streets. The first elevated railway and the first rapid transit line in Boston were built three years before the first underground line of the New York City Subway, but 34 years after the first London Underground lines, and long after the first elevated railway in New York City.

Various extensions and branches were added to the subway lines at both ends, bypassing more surface tracks. As grade-separated lines were extended, street-running lines were cut back for faster downtown service. The last elevated heavy rail or "El" inter-station segments in Boston – with the exception of the Red Line's still-active elevated tracks, connecting Charles/MGH station over Charles Circle to the Longfellow Bridge and the Cambridge Tunnel's northern portal – were at the extremities of the Orange Line: its northern end was relocated in 1975 from Everett to Malden, MA, and its southern end was relocated into the Southwest Corridor in 1987. However, the Green Line's Causeway Street Elevated remained in service until 2004, when it was relocated into a tunnel with an incline to reconnect to the Lechmere Viaduct.

The final section of elevated, between the Lechmere Viaduct and Lechmere station, was closed in 2020 for construction of the Green Line Extension.

System

Lines 
The rapid transit lines consist of 3 heavy rail (Metro) lines, 2 light rail lines, and a bus rapid transit line. The heavy rail Red Line has two southern branches, while the light rail Green Line has four services (B, C, D, and E) that use four western and two northern branches. The Silver Line has five bus rapid transit routes; two run on Washington Street with different downtown terminals, while three run underground in the Seaport with surface branches.

Coverage 

All four subway lines cross downtown, forming a quadrilateral configuration, and the Orange and Green Lines (which run approximately parallel in that district) also connect directly at two stations just north of downtown. The Red Line and Blue Line are the only pair of subway lines which do not have a direct transfer connection to each other. Because the various subway lines do not consistently run in any given compass direction, it is customary to refer to line directions as "inbound" or "outbound".  Inbound trains travel towards the four downtown transfer stations–Park Street, State Street, Government Center and Downtown Crossing–and outbound trains travel away from these hub stations.

Colors 
Originally, transit lines in the region only used geographic names; though numbering was added to public maps in 1936. The three heavy rail lines were assigned numbers 1, 2, and 3; what is now the Green Line was assigned different numbers for each branch. However, riders generally continued to use the geographic names. Colors were assigned on August 26, 1965, as part of a wider modernization under design standards developed by Cambridge Seven Associates, and have served as the primary identifier for the lines since then. The numbers for the heavy rail lines and the Mattapan Line were retained in public information until 1966. In 1967, the then-current five branches of the Green Line were lettered A through E.

Cambridge Seven originally intended to use red, yellow, green, and blue for the four lines. However, yellow proved unsuitable, since some patrons would have difficulty reading yellow text on a white background; orange was substituted, and yellow eventually was used for the MBTA bus service's visibility markings and signage. When sketching design concepts, Peter Chermayeff labeled the subway-surface light rail routes as the Green Line because they run adjacent to parts of the Emerald Necklace park system. The East Boston Tunnel became the Blue Line because it runs under Boston Harbor, and the Cambridge-Dorchester Tunnel became the Red Line because its northernmost terminus was then at Harvard University, whose school color is crimson. According to Chermayeff, the Main Line El "ended up being orange for no particular reason beyond color balance." The MBTA and transit historians later claimed that orange came from Orange Street, an early name for the street that ran southwards down the Boston Neck to connect the Shawmut Peninsula to the mainland, for what is now part of Washington Street.

Stations 

The MBTA rapid transit system consists of 147 stations, with the 5 most recent stations opening on December 12, 2022 as part of the Medford/Tufts branch of the Green Line Extension project in Somerville.

Rolling stock 

The MBTA is in the process of replacing its entire fleet of Red Line and Orange Line cars, which are over 40 years old, by 2023. The Blue Line cars were replaced in 2008. The Green Line has a variety of vehicles, some dating back to 1986, with the latest batch delivered in 2019.

All four transit lines use standard-gauge railway tracks, but are otherwise incompatible, with varying loading gauges, car lengths, platform heights, and power collection systems as detailed in the chart below:

{| class="wikitable" style="text-align: center;"
|+ MBTA subway car dimensions
|-
! scope="col" |Line
! scope="col" | Car length
! scope="col" | Car width
! scope="col" | Platform height
! scope="col" | Power
|-
|style="background-color:#"|||  ||  ||  || Third rail
|-
|style="background-color:#"|||  ||  ||  || Third rail
|-
|style="background-color:#"|||  ||  ||  || Third rail, overhead line
|-
|style="background-color:#"|||  ||  ||  || Overhead line
|}

There are no direct track connections between lines, except between the Red Line and Ashmont–Mattapan High Speed Line, but all except the Blue Line have little-used connections to the national rail network, which have been used for deliveries of railcars and supplies.

Fares 

As of July 1, 2019, MBTA fares are based on the trip type. A one-way ticket costs $2.40 whether loaded onto a reusable, fare-loadable CharlieCard, purchased as a single-use paper ticket, or paid in cash onboard the Green Line. The monthly LinkPass (which includes unlimited travel on rapid transit and bus) costs $90 per month. Daily and weekly passes are available at $11 and $22.50, respectively, and discounts are provided to seniors and high school students.  Children up to 11 years old ride free when accompanied by an adult; limit 2. Certain groups of government workers can ride for free.

See also 
 List of metro systems
 List of United States rapid transit systems by ridership

References

Notes

External links 
 Interactive MBTA Subway Map/Interactive Street Map
 "Vanishing Underground's" YouTube video, graphically chronicling the MBTA subway's evolution, back to 1888 Boston streetcar lines of the West End Street Railway

Underground rapid transit in the United States
Massachusetts Bay Transportation Authority
Public transportation in the Boston area
Rapid transit in Massachusetts
Rail transportation in Boston